Edwin Tsai is a Hong Kong former tennis player. Edwin is his birth name.

A left-hander, Tsai was the leading Hong Kong player of the 1950s, along with Ip Koon Hung. He featured in three editions of the Wimbledon Championships, reaching the singles second round twice. His tours of England included several tournament final appearances, including Moseley in 1952 and the Priory Club in 1953.

References

External links
 

Year of birth missing (living people)
Living people
Hong Kong male tennis players
Tennis players at the 1958 Asian Games
Asian Games competitors for Hong Kong